In geology, druse refers to a coating of fine crystals on a rock fracture surface or vein or within a vug or geode.

See also
 Crystal habit
 Miarolitic cavity

References

Mineral habits